Forests in Lithuania cover approximately 33% of Lithuania′s territory. Of these, about 50% are publicly owned, and 30% are privately owned; the remainder is reserved for possible future privatization. The dominant species are Scots pine (Pinus sylvestris) (42%) and spruce (Picea abies) (22.8%). The average age of the forest stands is 53 years. The largest forest is Dainava Forest at 1,350 km2.

Lithuania encompasses about 65,200 square km.  Based on an estimated average of 100 trees per hectare, there are over 200 million trees in Lithuania.

Footnotes

References

Literatur 
 Edvardas Riepšas. Lietuvos miškai. Visuotinė lietuvių enciklopedija, T. XII (Lietuva). – Vilnius: Mokslo ir enciklopedijų leidybos institutas, 2007. 66 psl.

 
Forests
Lithuania